Steve Frank (born 1950) is a former American football player and coach.  He served as the head football coach at Hamilton College in Clinton, New York from 1985 to 1999, compiling a record of 55–63–1. Frank played college football at the University of Bridgeport from 1968 to 1971.

References

1950 births
Living people
American football centers
Bridgeport Purple Knights football players
Davidson Wildcats football coaches
Hamilton Continentals football coaches
Norwich Cadets football coaches
Princeton Tigers football coaches